DuckTales is an American animated television series, developed by Matt Youngberg and Francisco Angones, and produced by Disney Television Animation. The series is a reboot of the original 1987 series of the same name, itself an adaptation of Uncle Scrooge and other Duck universe comic books created by Carl Barks, which focused on the lives of Scrooge McDuck and his family as they engaged in a variety of adventures around the world, as well as in the fictional city of Duckburg. The reboot itself focuses on newer elements and deeper character stories, including a greater involvement of Donald Duck.

The series premiered on August 12, 2017, with a 44-minute long pilot episode on Disney XD, before the first season was green-lit for broadcast from September 23 that year on Disney XD. From May 2018 to September 2019, the series was moved to Disney Channel for the previously not broadcast part of the first season and all of the second season. DuckTales was then moved back to Disney XD for its third season, and concluded with a 67-minute finale on March 15, 2021. Since its release, the reboot has generated positive reviews from critics and audiences, as well as a comic book series, a scripted podcast, and several online shorts.

Premise

After not speaking to each other for ten years, Donald Duck reunites with his estranged uncle, business mogul and former adventurer Scrooge McDuck, when he asks him to babysit his three triplet nephews, Huey, Dewey, and Louie, for the day. After accidentally releasing and defeating a few ancient evils, Scrooge regains his sense of adventure and invites Donald and the triplets to live at McDuck Manor with him, along with his housekeeper Mrs. Beakley and her granddaughter Webby Vanderquack. Together, along with Scrooge's chauffeur and pilot Launchpad McQuack, the Ducks go on many new treasure-hunting expeditions and globetrotting adventures while contending with villains like Flintheart Glomgold, Ma Beagle and the Beagle Boys, Magica De Spell, and Mark Beaks.

In the first season, Dewey and Webby search for the truth about Scrooge and Donald's strained relationship and the unexplained disappearance of the triplets' mother and Donald's twin sister Della Duck while Magica manipulates events to facilitate her return and seek revenge on Scrooge for imprisoning her in his Number One Dime for fifteen years.

In the second season, Scrooge and Glomgold compete to become the richest duck in the world by the end of the year, Louie tries to start up his own multi-million dollar business in hopes of following in Scrooge's footsteps, and Della reunites with her family following her escape from the Moon and adapts to her newfound motherhood, unaware that the Moonlanders, led by General Lunaris, are planning to invade Earth.

In the third season, the Ducks discover the journal of the legendary explorer Isabella Finch and journey to find all the lost artifacts detailed inside while the criminal organization F.O.W.L. attempt to eliminate Scrooge and his family and obtain the artifacts first as part of their plot to rid the world of adventuring.

Episodes

Voice cast

The show's main voice cast includes:

 David Tennant as Scrooge McDuck
 Danny Pudi as Huey Duck
 Ben Schwartz as Dewey Duck
 Bobby Moynihan as Louie Duck
 Kate Micucci as Webby Vanderquack 
 Beck Bennett as Launchpad McQuack
 Toks Olagundoye as Mrs. Beakley
 Tony Anselmo as Donald Duck
 Paget Brewster as Della Duck (main season 3, recurring season 2, guest season 1)

Production
Matt Youngberg and Francisco Angones grew up watching the original series and had always wanted to develop an updated version for a newer generation. Youngberg said, "We're hoping that in thirty years, the kids who watch our show will then be bringing back the next version of DuckTales because they loved what we did so much."

In May 2015, Terry McGovern, the original voice of Launchpad McQuack, stated in an interview that the entire voice cast from the original series would not be returning for the reboot, which made him "heartsick" at the news. The new voice cast for the series was revealed on December 16, 2016, in a video where they sing an a cappella version of the original theme song in promotion of the news. The following May, Lin-Manuel Miranda was announced as the voice of Fenton Crackshell-Cabrera / Gizmoduck. The character was changed to being Latino due to Lin-Manuel's heritage and because Angones felt that there were not enough positive Latino superheroes. In June, more cast members, including Tony Anselmo reprising his role as Donald Duck, were announced, and during the 2017 San Diego Comic-Con, Disney announced that Darkwing Duck would also make an appearance in the TV series.
At the 2019 San Diego Comic-Con, several characters from other Disney Television Animation cartoons were revealed to appear in the show's third season: Chip 'n Dale and the Rescue Rangers from Chip 'n Dale: Rescue Rangers; Kit Cloudkicker and Molly Cunningham from TaleSpin; Rhinokey and Butterbear from The Wuzzles; and Gosalyn Mallard and Taurus Bulba from Darkwing Duck; as well as Goofy (based on his Goof Troop incarnation), and Daisy Duck.

The art style of the show is heavily influenced not just by Carl Barks' original Uncle Scrooge comics, but also some of Barks' paintings. The theme song, written by Mark Mueller for the 1987 series, was re-recorded for the 2017 reboot. It was arranged by Michael "Smidi" Smithand and TJ Stafford and sung by Felicia Barton.

Donald Duck has a larger role in this version compared to the 1980s version. The earlier version had been restricted by an edict from The Walt Disney Company stating that the television studio could not use Donald or any of the other stars from Disney's Golden Age shorts, only allowing Donald to make short cameos to set up storylines; this restriction was lifted shortly after the original version of DuckTales ended.

Theme song
The popular theme song, written by pop songwriter Mark Mueller (both words and music), was the subject of a Vanity Fair magazine article in 2017, which called the song "History's Catchiest Single Minute of Music". The actual song is sung by Felicia Barton, a notable children's singer.

Release

Broadcast
The 44-minute pilot, titled Woo-oo!, premiered on August 12, 2017 at 12:00 AM and was repeated consecutively for the next 24 hours. Two days later on August 14, 2017 the pilot was also released on YouTube, though it has since been set to private. The pilot also aired on Disney Channel on September 17, 2017. The series officially premiered on September 23, 2017, coinciding with the original show's 30th anniversary. On May 1, 2018, the show moved to the Disney Channel, with new episodes airing on Fridays beginning May 4, 2018. With season three, the series returned to Disney XD.

On October 20, 2020, "Let's Get Dangerous!", the 44-minute Darkwing Duck-themed episode from season 3, was made available for free on Disney XD's YouTube channel.

In Canada, the pilot premiered on Disney XD on August 12 and the full series started on September 23, 2017. In Australia and New Zealand, the show premiered on Disney Channel on October 13, 2017. In the United Kingdom and Ireland, the pilot premiered on Disney Channel on November 4, 2017. The full series debuted on March 1, 2018, on Disney XD.

Marketing
On December 7, 2016, a teaser trailer was released for the series. The first season was announced to consist of 21 half-hour episodes and two hour-long specials. On March 10, 2017, a trailer for the series aired on Disney Channel during the premiere of Tangled: Before Ever After, and on June 14, 2017, the title sequence for the series, featuring a re-recording of the theme song written by Mark Mueller and performed by Felicia Barton, was released.

Home media
A DVD titled Woo-oo! was released on December 19, 2017, in the US and on July 9, 2018, in the UK and Ireland. The DVD contains the pilot episode and all 6 Welcome to Duckburg shorts. A second DVD titled Destination Adventure! was released on June 5, 2018. It contains the episodes The Beagle Birthday Massacre!, The Living Mummies of Toth-Ra!, The Impossible Summit of Mt. Neverrest!, The Spear of Selene!, The Missing Links of Moorshire!, and Beware the B.U.D.D.Y. System!, as well as 2 episodes of the original 1987 series previously unreleased on DVD (New Gizmo Kids on the Block and Ducky Mountain High).

Video on demand 
iTunes and Amazon Prime Video in the United States offer the first and second season, split into four volumes.

The first and second season have been released on Disney+ since its launch, but users have noted episodes being out of order. The series had its episodes arranged in the proper order on June 26, 2020. The entire third season was released on Disney+ on April 30, 2021.

Reception

Critical reception 
The review aggregator website Rotten Tomatoes reports an approval rating of 100% based on 12 reviews, with an average rating of 9/10. The website's critical consensus reads, "Highly energetic, distinctively designed, and attuned to its nostalgia, this update to a Disney animated classic is far bolder than its predecessor."

IGN's Chris Hayner gave the series premiere, "Woo-oo!", a score of 8.5 out of 10, stating that the reboot "may be aimed at modern young audiences but there's no denying the heart and adventurous spirit it gets from the original series." IndieWire complimented the series premiere, claiming that "the reboot of the series keeps all of those important original hallmarks. American Idol alum Felicia Barton re-recorded the signature theme song but keeps its sense of fun and excitement intact." Collider rated the last season 5 out of 5, indicating that "Season 3 is really where the new vision of the fan-favorite series takes off." Den of Geek reviewed the last episode of the show positively, stating, "DuckTales has power; it'll keep having power. Now that the show’s ended I have no doubt more people will check it out on Disney+ and realize how special it was. How great it was. How even if it still had more stories to tell it still gave all it had." ComicsBeat praised the series, saying, "With an unimpeachable cast, a clever sense of humor, and a commitment to the underlying thematic concerns of the story, these three seasons represent the best-case scenario for the reboot of a beloved TV show: a sensationally self-aware series that takes its characters seriously while still delivering side-splitting slapstick." CinemaBlend.com gave a positive review of the series, praising the humour of the show, alongside the performance of the voice actors.

Disney comics creator Don Rosa, primarily known for his Uncle Scrooge comic sub-series The Life and Times of Scrooge McDuck, has stated that the DuckTales reboot series bears "virtually no similarity whatsoever" to Barks' original comics.

Accolades

Printed media

Prose books
In 2018, Disney Press published "DuckTales: Solving Mysteries and Rewriting History!", a companion book covering the majority of season one, as seen from the perspective of Scrooge, Huey, Dewey, Louie, and Webby. It is written by Rob Renzetti and show writer Rachel Vine.

Art book 
In 2022, Ken Plume revealed he was working on a DuckTales art book. Titled "The Art of DuckTales", the book was published by Dark Horse Comics and released on October 24, 2022.

Comics
An ongoing comic book series based on the show is being published by IDW Publishing, with Joe Caramagna, Joey Cavalieri and Steve Behling sharing writing duties, and Luca Usai, Gianfranco Florio and others providing the art. Ducktales #0 was released on July 19, 2017, and #1 of the monthly series followed on September 27.

The individual issues are also collected in trade paperbacks:
"Treasure Trove", collecting issues #0-2
"Mysteries and Mallards", collecting issues #3-5
"Quests and Quacks", collecting issues #6-8
"Fowl Play", collecting issues #9-11
"Monsters and Mayhem", collecting issues #12-14
"Mischief and Miscreants", collecting issues #15-17
"Imposters and Interns"  , collecting issues #18-20

List of comic book stories

Podcast
On March 10, 2021, it was announced that a seven-episode scripted podcast spinoff of the series would be launching via the Disney XD YouTube channel on March 29, two weeks after the series finale. The podcast is called This Duckburg Life (a parody of the popular public radio program/podcast This American Life) and is hosted by Huey Duck for "Duckburg Public Radio" and focuses on slice of life occurrences in Duckburg. Many of the cast from the series reprise their roles, including Tennant, Pudi, Schwartz, Moynihan, Micucci, Bennett, Olagundoye, Rash, Brener, Martindale, and Anselmo.

Merchandise

References

External links 
 
 

DuckTales
2010s American animated television series
2020s American animated television series
2017 American television series debuts
2017 animated television series debuts
American animated adventure television series
American animated comedy television series
Amputees in fiction
English-language television shows
Disney Channel original programming
Disney XD original programming
Donald Duck television series
Animated television series reboots
Television series by Disney Television Animation
Television shows based on comics
Animated television series about ducks
Animated television series about families
2021 American television series endings